The Bangladesh national cricket team toured Ireland for a 3 match Twenty20 series held in Belfast against Ireland. The Bangladesh team then travelled to the Netherlands for a T20I match each against Scotland and the Netherlands.

Squads

In Ireland

All times are Western European Summer Time (UTC+1).

1st Warm-up Match

2nd Warm-up Match

1st T20I

2nd T20I

3rd T20I

In Netherlands

All times are Central European Summer Time (UTC+2).

Only T20I

1st T20I

2nd T20I

References

International cricket competitions in 2012
Bangladesh–Netherlands relations
2012 in Irish cricket
2012 in Dutch sport